DOER Marine (Deep Ocean Exploration and Research) is a marine technology company established in 1992 by oceanographer Sylvia Earle, based in Alameda, California. It is developing a vehicle, Deepsearch (and Ocean Explorer HOV Unlimited), with some support from Google's Eric Schmidt with which a crew of two or three will take 90 minutes to reach the seabed, as the program Deep Search.

References

External links
DOER Marine website

Companies based in Alameda, California
Technology companies based in the San Francisco Bay Area
1992 establishments in California